The Diocesan Shrine of Saint Augustine, commonly known as the Parish of Santa Cruz, is a Roman Catholic Church in the municipality of Tanza, in the province of Cavite, Philippines.  The shrine is under the jurisdiction of the Diocese of Imus. The patron of the town is  Saint Augustine of Hippo commonly known as "Tata Usteng". The Holy Cross serves as the titular patron. The town patronal feast is celebrated annually every August 28.

History

Establishment

Historical marker
The parish was declared a structure of historical significance with the placing of a historical marker by then National Historical Institute of the Philippines on May 3, 1980. As a historical church, the provincial government of Cavite considers the parish as part of the "faith tourism" during the Holy Week.

Vicariate of The Holy Cross (Tanza and Rosario)

Vicar Forane: Rev Fr. Virgilio Mendoza

Our Lady of the Holy Rosary Parish, Amaya, Tanza - Parish Priest: Rev. Fr. Bobby Capino
St. John Paul II Parish, Paradahan, Tanza - Parish Priest: Rev. Fr. Ronel Ilano
San Isidro Labrador Parish, Ligtong, Rosario - Parish Priest: Rev. Fr. Monico Tagulao
The Holy Cross Parish and Diocesan Shrine of Saint Augustine, Tanza (Town Proper) - Parish Priest: Rev. Fr. Virgilio Mendoza  Parochial Vicar: Rev. Fr. Alvin Presco
The Most Holy Rosary Parish, Rosario (Town Proper) - Parish Priest: Rev. Fr. Leoben Peregrino  Parochial Vicar: Rev. Fr. Armando Timajo
The Resurrection Parish, Julugan, Tanza - Parish Priest: Rev. Fr. Elorde Gomez

References

Roman Catholic churches in Cavite
1780 establishments in the Philippines
Churches in the Roman Catholic Diocese of Imus